Category 4 hurricanes are tropical cyclones that reach Category 4 intensity on the Saffir–Simpson scale.  Category 4 hurricanes that later attained Category 5 strength are not included in this list. The Atlantic basin includes the open waters of the Atlantic Ocean, the Caribbean Sea and the Gulf of Mexico. Category 4 is the second-highest hurricane classification category on the Saffir–Simpson Hurricane Scale, and storms that are of this intensity maintain maximum sustained winds of 113–136 knots (130–156 mph, 209–251 km/h). Based on the Atlantic hurricane database, 144 hurricanes have attained Category 4 hurricane status since 1851, the start of modern meteorological record keeping. Category 4 storms are considered extreme hurricanes. Hurricane Ike, which was a Category 4 storm, brought on a  storm surge, the third greatest storm surge ever recorded (after Hurricane Katrina and Hurricane Camille, respectively).

Statistics

Wind, Damage, and Storm Surge statistics 
Category 4 hurricanes have maximum sustained winds of 113–136 knots (130–156 mph, 209–251 km/h). "Sustained winds" refers to the average wind speed observed over one minute at a height of 10 meters (33 ft) above ground. Gusts can be up to 30% higher than the sustained winds. Mobile homes and other buildings without fixed structures can be completely destroyed, and the lower floors of sturdier structures usually sustain major damage. In addition to the winds, the cyclones generally produce a storm surge of 13–18 feet (4–5.5 m) above normal, potentially causing major beach erosion. Heavy, irreparable damage and/or near complete destruction of gas station canopies and other wide span overhang type structures are also very common, and mobile and manufactured homes are often completely destroyed. Low-level terrain may be flooded well inland, as well. In addition, Category 4 hurricanes are often Cape Verde-type hurricanes. Cape Verde hurricanes are usually the strongest, and their track sometimes points them towards the United States, or other land.

Air pressure statistics 
The record high and low statistics for a Category 4 hurricane, in terms of pressure in millibars (mbar) and hectopascals (hPa), are Hurricane Opal of 1995, peaking at a record low of 916 mbar/hPa, and the 1926 Nassau hurricane, peaking at a record high of 967 mbar/hPa. These, on average, are the peaks of a Category 5 major hurricane and a Category 2 hurricane. The average pressure for a Category 4 Atlantic hurricane is between 932 and 945 mbar/hPa, just to delimit boundaries of what pressure a Category 4 hurricane peaks at.

History of Category 4 Atlantic hurricanes 
The number of Category 4 and 5 hurricanes appears to have nearly doubled in occurrence from 1970 to 2004. It is likely that the increase in Atlantic tropical storm and hurricane frequency is primarily due to improved monitoring.

Due to growing population in major coastal cities, many areas have become more vulnerable to strong hurricanes, especially categories 4 and 5.

Meteorological measurements
All of the storms listed in this analysis are listed in chronological order, but they also list the minimum central pressure and maximum sustained winds. Each of these meteorological readings are taken using a specific meteorological instrument. For modern storms, the minimum pressure measurements are taken by reconnaissance aircraft using dropsondes, or by determining it from satellite imagery using the Dvorak technique. For older storms, pressures are often incomplete, typically being provided by ship-reports or land-observations. None of these methods can provide constant pressure measurements; thus it is possible the only measurement occurred when the cyclone was at a lesser strength. Sustained winds are taken using an Anemometer at 10 meters (33 ft) above the ground.

Climatology
A total of 94 hurricanes in the Atlantic Ocean Basin, including the Gulf of Mexico and the Caribbean, have reached Category 4 status as their peak intensity. (Note that Category 4 storms that intensified later to Category 5 status are not included in this analysis.)
 
Most Category 4 hurricanes occur during September, with 51 storms occurring in that month. This coincides with the average peak of the Atlantic hurricane season, which occurs on September 10. Most Category 4 hurricanes develop in the warm waters of the Gulf of Mexico and the Caribbean Sea. Several Category 4 hurricanes are Cape Verde-type hurricanes. 
There have been no Category 4 hurricanes to form in either May or December, or in any other month outside the traditional bounds of the Atlantic hurricane season.

Systems

1851–1949 

|-
| Unnamed ||  ||  ||  || None ||  ||  ||
|-
| Unnamed ||  ||  ||  || United States Gulf Coast || || ||
|-
| Unnamed ||  ||   ||  || The Caribbean || || ||
|-
| Unnamed ||  ||  ||  || The Caribbean || || ||
|-
| Unnamed ||  ||  ||  || The Caribbean, Mexico, Texas || || ||
|-
| Unnamed ||  ||  ||  || None ||  ||  ||
|-
| Unnamed ||  ||   ||  ||  The Caribbean, Southeastern United States || || ||
|-
| Unnamed ||  ||  ||  || || || ||
|-
| Unnamed ||  ||   ||  || || || ||
|-
| Unnamed ||  ||   ||  || || || ||
|-
| Unnamed ||  ||   ||  || Eastern United States, Atlantic Canada || || ||
|-
| Unnamed ||  ||  ||  || The Caribbean, Eastern United States, Atlantic Canada || || ||
|-
| Unnamed ||  ||   ||  || The Caribbean, Eastern United States, Atlantic Canada || || ||
|-
| Unnamed ||  ||  ||  || Lesser Antiles, Greater Antiles || || ||
|-
| Unnamed ||  ||  ||  || || || ||
|-
| Unnamed ||  ||  ||  || || || ||
|-
| Unnamed ||  ||  ||  || || || ||
|-
| Unnamed ||  ||  ||  || || || ||
|-
| Unnamed ||  ||  ||  || || || ||
|-
| Unnamed ||  ||  ||  || || || ||
|-
| Unnamed ||  ||  ||  || || || ||
|-
| Unnamed ||  ||  ||  || || || ||
|-
| Unnamed ||  ||  ||  || || || ||
|-
| Unnamed ||  ||  ||  || || || ||
|-
| Unnamed ||  ||  ||  || || || ||
|-
| Unnamed ||  ||  ||  || The Bahamas, Eastern United States, Atlantic Canada || || ||
|-
| Unnamed ||  ||  ||  || The Caribbean, Southeastern United States || || ||
|-
| Unnamed || September 1931 ||  || 
|-
| Unnamed || August 1932||  || 
|-
| Unnamed || September 1932 ||  || 
|-
| Unnamed || August 1933 ||  || 
|-
| Unnamed || August, September 1933 ||  || 
|-
| Unnamed || September 1933 ||  || 
|-
| Unnamed || August 1935 ||  || 
|-
| Unnamed || September, October 1935 ||  || 
|-
| Unnamed || October 1939 ||  || 
|-
| Unnamed || September 1941 ||  || 
|-
| Unnamed || August 1943 ||  || –
|-
| Unnamed || October 1944 ||  || 
|-
| Unnamed || September 1945 ||  || 
|-
| Unnamed || September 1947 ||  || 
|-
| Unnamed || September 1948 ||  || 
|-
| Unnamed || September 1948 ||  || 
|-
| Unnamed || August 1949 ||  || 
|-
|}

1950–1974 

In the years between 1950 and 1974, there were 23 Category 4 hurricanes in the Atlantic Ocean. A  denotes that the storm temporarily weakened below Category 4 intensity during the specified period of time.

1975–1999 

In the years between 1976 and 1999, 23 Category 4 hurricanes formed in the basin:

2000–present
In the years since 2000, 36 Category 4 hurricanes formed within the confines of the Atlantic Ocean. A  denotes that the storm temporarily weakened below Category 4 intensity during the specified period of time.

Number by month

Landfalls
The following hurricanes made landfall at some location at any strength. Due to inaccuracies in data, tropical depression landfalls are not included. Category 5 hurricanes are also not included in the table below. Several of these storms weakened slightly after attaining Category 4 status as they approached land; this is usually a result of dry air, shallower water due to shelving, cooler waters, or interaction with land.

See also
 
Atlantic hurricane season
Lists of Atlantic hurricanes
List of Category 3 Atlantic hurricanes
List of Category 4 Pacific hurricanes
List of Category 5 Atlantic hurricanes
List of Category 5 Pacific hurricanes

References

 
Category 4
Atlantic 4